Clifford Blackmore is an American politician and businessman who served as a member of the Kansas House of Representatives from 2020 to 2021.

Career 
Blackmore was appointed to the Kansas House by Republican Party committee members in Miami County following the resignation of former Rep. Jene Vickrey in July 2020. Blackmore was sworn in on July 27, 2020 following his formal appointment by Governor Laura Kelly.

Blackmore was defeated in the August 4, 2020 Republican primary for the sixth district seat by Samantha Poetter, a former aide to Kansas Secretary of State Kris Kobach.

References

Living people
Republican Party members of the Kansas House of Representatives
21st-century American politicians
People from Miami County, Kansas
Year of birth missing (living people)